Arturo Manrique (1910–1971) was a Mexican film actor.

Selected filmography
 The Woman of the Port (1934)
 The Treasure of Pancho Villa (1935)
 Luponini from Chicago (1935)
 Judas (1936)
 The Heavy Cross (1937)
 Song of the Soul (1938)
 Jesusita in Chihuahua (1942)
 Bandito (1956)

References

Bibliography
 Emilio García Riera. Historia documental del cine mexicano: 1929-1937. Universidad de Guadaljara, 1992.

External links

1910 births
1971 deaths
Mexican male film actors
Male actors from Monterrey